Odd Fellows Home District is a national historic district located at Liberty, Clay County, Missouri.  It encompasses three contributing buildings, one contributing site, and four contributing structures associated with an institutional home and hospital. The district developed between about 1900 and 1935, and representative examples of Tudor Revival and Jacobethan Revival architecture.  The contributing buildings are the Administration Building, the Old Folks Building (1907-1908), and the Old Hospital (1923).  Also on the property is the historic Odd Fellows Home Cemetery.

It was listed on the National Register of Historic Places in 1987.

In popular culture
The Travel Channel's television show Destination Fear filmed at the haunted Odd Fellows Home for the sixth episode of their third season.

References

Historic districts on the National Register of Historic Places in Missouri
Tudor Revival architecture in Missouri
Buildings and structures in Clay County, Missouri
National Register of Historic Places in Clay County, Missouri
Liberty, Missouri